Russell S. Brown (born September 15, 1965) is a puisne justice of the Supreme Court of Canada. He was nominated by Prime Minister Stephen Harper to replace outgoing justice Marshall Rothstein and has been serving in the role since August 31, 2015. Prior to his appointment to the Supreme Court, he was a justice at the Alberta Court of Appeal, and before that a law professor at the University of Alberta.

Early life and education 
Brown was born in Vancouver, British Columbia, and raised in Burns Lake, British Columbia.

Brown has a Bachelor of Arts degree from the University of British Columbia in 1987 and a Bachelor of Laws degree from the University of Victoria in 1994. He also has a Master of Laws degree in 2003 and a Doctor of Juridical Science degree both from the University of Toronto in 2006.

Career 

Brown was admitted to the Bar of British Columbia in 1995 and to the Bar of Alberta in 2008. Before being appointed a judge he was associate counsel to Miller Thomson LLP and an Associate Professor and Associate Dean at the University of Alberta Faculty of Law. His main areas of practice were commercial law, medical negligence, public authority liability, insurance law and trusts and estates.

In 2013, he was appointed to the Court of Queen's Bench of Alberta. A year later in March 2014, he was appointed to the Court of Appeal of Alberta.

He has expressed his views on a number of topics in a University of Alberta law faculty blog, prior to his appointment to the bench. He called the Canada Health Act “an inappropriate [federal] intrusion into sacrosanct provincial swimming pools,” referred to third party election spending limits as "odious" and "restriction on private expenditure during elections" as "objectionable", described human rights commissions as "puritanical functionaries", and described himself as a "conservative libertarian".

Appointment to the Supreme Court 

Brown was nominated by Prime Minister Stephen Harper to replace retiring justice Marshall Rothstein on the Supreme Court of Canada. Brown was his eighth and final appointment to the Court, as the Conservatives would lose the 2015 election. At the time of the nomination it was expected that Harper would name someone from Saskatchewan, but Harper opted for Brown instead, who was from Alberta. This meant that there would be two appointees from Alberta (Chief Justice Beverley McLachlin was also from Alberta), however this still satisfied the constitutional convention requiring two justices from Western Canada on the Court.

His appointment proved controversial due to the surfacing of his blog posts. The Toronto Star published an article from John Whyte, a professor emeritus at the Queen’s University Faculty of Law, criticizing the appointment. Whyte called Brown unfit for the Court because of his political writings and activism, and also attacked Harper for even naming a justice so close to an election campaign. Brown would nonetheless be sworn in on August 31, 2015, and without a Parliamentary hearing as Harper had discontinued the voluntary practice with the appointment of Suzanne Côté a year prior.

The appointment of Brown has been recognized in retrospect as one of three major appointments - alongside the appointment of Côté a year earlier and the subsequent appointment of Malcolm Rowe by Justin Trudeau - which shifted the balance of the Court and ended an era of broad liberal consensus that dominated the McLachlin Court.

At the Supreme Court 
Within his first year, Brown co-wrote the majority opinion for the blockbuster speedy trial case R v Jordan. A sharply divided Court established ceilings on how long the state has to bring an individual to trial. The decision attacked a "culture of complacency" that had developed towards the speedy trial rights of the accused and radically altered the application of section 11(b) of the Charter, leading to numerous cases being thrown out on account of unreasonable delay.

After Jordan, Brown continued to show an inclination towards the rights of accused in cases that pitted law enforcement objectives against the fair trial rights of defendants. In R v Le he co-wrote a majority opinion throwing out the conviction of a young Asian-Canadian man, holding that he had been detained during an interaction with the police and should've consequently been advised of his right to counsel. The ruling emphasized how personal characteristics like race and youth can impact how individuals perceive police interactions, noting that certain forms of questioning that might seem voluntary to individuals from some communities might be perceived as compulsory and a detention to others.

His expansive interpretation of the legal rights in the Charter was also apparent in dissents he wrote, co-wrote, and joined. He dissented in R v JJ, in when the Court upheld a new rape-shield law which required pre-screening of private records before they could be admitted in trial. His dissent attacked the law as an unprecedented affront to the right to make full answer and defence, and as a form of defence disclosure that could taint the testimony of witnesses by allowing them to see the defences' evidence ahead of time. In another unreasonable delay case R v KJM , this time in dissent, he co-wrote an opinion calling for the pretrial delay ceilings to be lower for juvenile offenders because of the uniquely prejudicial effect delay has on them. In R v Stairs, he joined a dissent by justice Andromache Karakatsanis, calling for tougher standards for when police officers can search the home.

In June 2018, Brown wrote a high profile dissent with Justice Côté on the topic of religious freedom in the case of Law Society of British Columbia v. Trinity Western University. The case concerned the constitutionality of a law society's decision to refuse accreditation to a university because it required students to sign a covenant promising to refrain from sexual activity outside of heterosexual marriage as a condition for studying at the university. The majority upheld the law society's decision as reasonable, but he wrote in dissent that "in a liberal and pluralist society, the public interest is served, and not undermined, by the accommodation of difference. The unequal access resulting from the covenant is a function not of condonation of discrimination, but of accommodating religious freedom."

In March 2021, the Supreme Court found that the federal government's carbon price regime is constitutional. Brown was one of three dissenting justices. He concluded that the federal government's carbon price law was unconstitutional because it interfered with areas of exclusive provincial jurisdiction. Following the decision, Sean Speer wrote in the National Post that Brown "has distinguished himself as a powerful critic of judicial overreach in general and progressive jurisprudence in particular. In so doing, he’s become an intellectual beachhead for a nascent conservative legal movement in the country." He went on to write that his dissents "lay out an alternative viewpoint about the role of courts, the division of powers between Ottawa and the provinces and the relationship between the individual and the state."

In February 2023, Brown took a leave of absence from the Supreme Court following a conduct complaint being reviewed by the Canadian Judicial Council. The complaint stemmed from a January 28−29 overnight incident at a high-end resort in Scottsdale, Arizona, where Brown delivered a speech on behalf of former Supreme Court Justice Louise Arbour, who had received the 2023 Sandra Day O’Connor prize from Arizona State University. According to the complaint, after being invited to join a group's table at the resort bar, Brown was intoxicated, deemed "creepy" by some of the female members of the group, and tried to follow them to their room, leading to the complainant to punch Brown in the face and call the police. After the details of the complaint were reported on, Brown issued a statement calling the allegations "demonstrably false".

See also
Reasons of the Supreme Court of Canada by Justice Brown

References

1965 births
Living people
Justices of the Supreme Court of Canada
Judges in Alberta
People from Vancouver
Academic staff of the University of Alberta
University of British Columbia alumni
University of Toronto alumni
University of Victoria alumni
University of Toronto Faculty of Law alumni
University of Victoria Faculty of Law alumni
21st-century Canadian judges